Eucalyptus cupularis, commonly known as the Halls Creek white gum, or in the local indigenous Djaru peoples' language as wawulinggi, is a species of small tree that is endemic to an area in northwestern Australia. It has smooth, powdery white bark, lance-shaped or curved adult leaves, flower buds in groups of seven, white flowers and cup-shaped to conical fruit.

Description
It has powdery, white smooth bark that is pale pink when young. Flowering occurs between October and November and the flowers are white.

Eucalyptus cupularis is similar in appearance to and closely related to the Kalumburu gum (E. herbertiana) and the mountain white gum (E. mooreana).

Taxonomy and naming
Eucalyptus cupularis was first formally described by the botanist Charles Austin Gardner in 1964 from a specimen collected on stony hills to the west of Halls Creek and the description was published in the Journal of the Royal Society of Western Australia. The specific epithet (cupularis) is the diminutive form of the Latin word cupa meaning "cup", hence "little cup", referring to the shape of the fruit.

Distribution and habitat
The range of Halls Creek white gum extends from the Kimberley region of Western Australia and into the Northern Territory where it grows in open woodland on stony hills and along watercourses in skeletal soils over sandstone or granite.

See also
List of Eucalyptus species

References

Eucalypts of Western Australia
Flora of the Northern Territory
Trees of Australia
cupularis
Myrtales of Australia
Plants described in 1964
Taxa named by Charles Gardner